I Witnessed Genocide: Inside Sri Lanka's Killing Fields is a 2011 investigative documentary film by Ms. Priyamvatha of the Indian news channel Headlines Today. Ms. Priyamvatha went undercover to the Vanni to report on the survivors of the Sri Lankan Civil War.

The documentary telecasts on-ground interviews with survivors who narrate accounts of sexual abuse in internment camps, the use of chemical and cluster bombs by the Sri Lanka Armed Forces, killing of thousands of civilians in aerial bombardment and artillery attacks and continued denial of their basic rights.

Priyamvatha received the prestigious "Best investigative news report" award for the documentary, in the 2012 News Television Award in New Delhi. Findings from the documentary were quoted during debates in both houses of India's Parliament and in the Tamil Nadu Assembly.

References

2011 television films
2011 films
Documentary films about human rights
Documentary films about the Sri Lankan Civil War
Documentary films alleging war crimes
Indian documentary films
2011 documentary films